The François Bâby House is a historic residence located in Windsor, Ontario, Canada which was owned by the prominent local politician François Baby. The house is a two-storey, Georgian style, red brick house once known as La Ferme locally, and was a French-Canadian ribbon farm which was a long narrow tract fronting endwise on the Detroit River. The home itself has historical ties to the War of 1812 where it was used  as a headquarters by both the American and British forces.

Today, the François Baby House has been designated as a National Historic Site of Canada and serves as the current home of Windsor's Community Museum, a historical museum which displays the city's rich and colourful past.

Timeline 
1751 - November 24. Land including site of the house granted by Pierre Celoron, Sieur de Bienville, commandant at French Detroit, to Pierre Réaume.
1800 - December 19. Suzanne Réaume Baby sold the farm to her son François for ten shillings plus one grain of pepper.
1812 - Spring and summer. Construction of the house. Original front faced the Detroit River
1812 - July 12. War of 1812 opened with invasion of Upper Canada across the Detroit River. Baby house commandeered, unfinished, by American Brigadier General William Hull
1812 - July 13. Defensive works established around the three inland sides. American camp was located in Baby's orchard.
1812 - August 7. Hull's position had worsened, and he withdrew his troops to the safety of Fort Lernoult, directly across the river from the house.
1812 - August 15. Arrival of main British force on upper Detroit River, led by Major General Isaac Brock. Bombardment of Detroit began. Americans returned fire.
1812 - August 16. Bombardment continued, and Detroit surrendered to invading British, Canadians, and Indians.
1838 - December 4. Battle of Windsor, fought in the Baby orchard, ended the Patriot War, which had resulted from political disturbances in Upper Canada. Invading "Patriots" were largely American.
1850 - October 8. Fire heavily damaged Baby House.
1890 - The House had been converted to a double dwelling. Original north porch replaced by a full-width lean-to. Pitt Street side became the front. Bay windows connecting porch, gables added to new front.
 1931 - House abandoned during the Great Depression.
1948 - Partial renovation. Additions removed, Pitt Street wall replaced.
1958 - Final renovation. François Baby House opened May 7 as the Hiram Walker Historical Museum.
1968 - Addition of underground storage and outdoor display facility

References

 "Mansion to Museum: The François Baby House And Its Times" Written by R. Alan Douglas, Essex County Historical Society, 1989.
 Windsor's Community Museum

External links 

 Windsor's Community Museum 

Buildings and structures in Windsor, Ontario
Burned buildings and structures in Canada
Georgian architecture in Canada
Houses in Ontario
National Historic Sites in Ontario
Designated heritage properties in Ontario